Eadred (died 1042) was Bishop of Durham in around 1040. He had been the head of the cathedral chapter when Edmund the previous bishop died. Eadred is said to have taken money from the cathedral funds and purchased the office of bishop from the king. Symeon of Durham states that because of the sin of simony, Eadred died before he could be enthroned as bishop.

Citations

References

 
 

Bishops of Durham
1042 deaths
Year of birth unknown
Simony
11th-century English Roman Catholic bishops